The Time Machine is the third solo album by English rock musician Alan Parsons.

While the sound of this album is similar to some of the soft, ethereal tracks by the Alan Parsons Project, none of the writing or performance credits in the sleeve notes go to Alan Parsons, except for one short and simple instrumental part on "Temporalia" (the other instrumentals were written by drummer Stuart Elliott and guitarist Ian Bairnson), the Japanese bonus track "Beginnings" which also features his voice, and organ on "No Future in the Past"; his relation to the album is almost exclusively as producer. The album lacks much of the rock edge of the previous albums up to and including On Air.

Concept

The themes of time, time travel, and memory of the past had been suggested by Parsons as subject matter for the second Alan Parsons Project album, but writing partner Eric Woolfson favoured a purely futuristic theme of robotic beings eventually displacing the human race, which eventually resulted in the album I Robot.

"Temporalia" features a narration by professor Frank Close on the idea of the universe itself acting as a sort of time machine; this is an extract of "Equinox – The rubber Universe". "Press Rewind" ponders what a person might do if they were able to reverse time, and change decisions they had made. "Out of the Blue" relates to a time traveller from the future. "Call Up" is about great people from history and, according to Ian Bairnson, "the effect they would have on the World right now, if they were here". "Ignorance Is Bliss" talks about how sad people are in comparison to ancient and simpler times, and the possibility of change for good to a simple way of life. "Rubber Universe" is related to the expansion of the universe.

"The Call of the Wild" talks about a future when mankind will be one without any separation (ethnicities, faith, nations, etc.). The melody of this song is a variation of the traditional Irish folk song "She Moves Through the Fair". "No Future in the Past" talks about avoiding repeating past mistakes. "The Very Last Time" is a song about people that have gone and never been seen again. The song was written about Bairnson's recently deceased dog, Gemma. "Far Ago and Long Away" is a play on words, as in relativity space = time, so "far away" = "far ago" and "long ago" = "long away".

The album cover has several images related to time and popular time-travel icons, including a photography camera, a clock mechanism, a police box as a reference to the TARDIS in Doctor Who, a wormhole-like tunnel effect from the opening sequence, a DeLorean sports car referring to the Back to the Future series, and a child playing with a model ship from the Star Trek franchise.

Video promo
The video promo of "The Time Machine" was completely made (3D modeling, animation and rendering) by Ben Liebrand and was released on 1 September 1999. It includes two designs created by Storm Thorgerson (Hipgnosis UK) and translated by Liebrand into a 3D composition. He made everything in four weeks using Softimage 3D Extreme.

Track listing
"The Time Machine (Part 1)" (Stuart Elliott)  – instrumental – 4:54
"Temporalia" (Parsons) – instrumental with narration by Professor Frank Close – 1:00
"Out of the Blue" (Bairnson) – lead vocal Tony Hadley – 4:54
"Call Up" (Bairnson) – lead vocal Neil Lockwood – 5:13
"Ignorance Is Bliss" (Bairnson) – lead vocal Colin Blunstone  – 6:45
"Rubber Universe" (Bairnson) – instrumental – 3:52
"The Call of the Wild" (Bairnson) – lead vocal Máire Brennan – 5:22
"No Future in the Past" (Elliott) – lead vocal Neil Lockwood – 4:46
"Press Rewind" (Elliott) – lead vocal Graham Dye – 4:20
"The Very Last Time" (Bairnson) – lead vocal Beverley Craven – 3:42
"Far Ago and Long Away" (Bairnson) – instrumental – 5:14
"The Time Machine (Part 2)" (Elliott) – instrumental – 1:47

Bonus tracks
 "Beginnings" (Elliott/Parsons) – instrumental with narration by Alan Parsons – 4:31
 "Dr. Evil" (edit) – instrumental with the voice of Mike Myers – 3:23

On the Japanese release, "The Time Machine" is named "H.G. Force" (a reference to H.G. Wells).

"Dr. Evil" (edit) is a remix of "The Time Machine" that features the voice of Mike Myers from the second Austin Powers movie, The Spy Who Shagged Me, in which the Alan Parsons Project is mentioned. It is available on most releases which feature a bonus track. The title track was also released as a single with more remix variants. "Beginnings" is available only on the Japanese release, which does not include the "Dr. Evil" remix.

Personnel 
 Alan Parsons – keyboards, organ, composer, engineer, producer, narration on "Beginnings"
 Ian Bairnson – guitars, mandolin, bass, keyboards, saxophone, backing vocals, composer
 Stuart Elliott – drums, drum programming, percussion, keyboards, keyboard programming, orchestral arrangement, composer
 Richard Cottle – keyboards, additional keyboards
 Robyn Smith – keyboards, piano
 John Giblin – bass guitar
 Kathryn Tickell – bagpipes, Northumbrian pipes on "The Call of the Wild"
 Julian Sutton – melodeon on "The Call of the Wild"
 Claire Orsler – viola on "The Very Last Time"
 Jackie Norrie, Julia Singleton – violin on "The Very Last Time"
 The Philharmonia Orchestra – strings, brass, horns
 Clio Gould – orchestra leader
 Andrew Powell – orchestral arrangement and conductor
 Tony Hadley, Neil Lockwood, Colin Blunstone, Moya Brennan, Beverley Craven, Graham Dye, Chris Rainbow – lead vocals
 Chris Rainbow, Stuart Elliott – backing vocals
 Frank Close – narration on "Temporalia"

Charts

References

 Personnel: https://www.discogs.com/fr/Alan-Parsons-The-Time-Machine/release/492948

Alan Parsons albums
1999 albums
Albums with cover art by Storm Thorgerson